The 1999–2000 Iowa State Cyclones women's basketball team represented Iowa State University in the 1999–2000 NCAA Division I women's basketball season. This was head coach Bill Fennelly's 5th season at Iowa State. The Cyclones were members of the Big 12 Conference and played their home games at the Hilton Coliseum. They finished the season 27–6, 13–3 in Big 12 play to finish tied for first place. They were the champions of the Big 12 women's tournament defeating Texas by 10 points in the finals.

References

Iowa State Cyclones women's basketball seasons
Iowa State
Iowa State
Iowa State Cyc
Iowa State Cyc